Chrysopida is a genus of leaf beetles in the subfamily Eumolpinae. It is distributed in the Philippines, Celebes and Taiwan.

Species
The following species are placed in the genus:
 Chrysopida attelaboides (Erichson, 1834)
 Chrysopida aureovillosa Lefèvre, 1885
 Chrysopida depressicollis Lefèvre, 1885
 Chrysopida festiva Baly, 1861
 Chrysopida insignis Baly, 1867
 Chrysopida multisulcata Medvedev, 1995
 Chrysopida murina Baly, 1867
 Chrysopida nigrita Weise, 1913
 Chrysopida pubipennis Lefèvre, 1885
 Chrysopida regalis Baly, 1864
 Chrysopida semperi Lefèvre, 1885
 Chrysopida subglabrata Jacoby, 1898
 Chrysopida tristis Medvedev, 1995
 Chrysopida viridis Medvedev, 1995

The following are synonyms of other species:
 Chrysopida adonis Baly, 1861: synonym of Chrysopida attelaboides (Erichson, 1834)
 Chrysopida curta Lefèvre, 1885: synonym of Chrysopida murina Baly, 1867

References

Eumolpinae
Chrysomelidae genera
Beetles of Asia
Taxa named by Joseph Sugar Baly